Episemasia is a genus of moths in the family Geometridae first described by George Duryea Hulst in 1896.

Species
 Episemasia cervinaria (Packard, 1873)
 Episemasia solitaria (Walker, 1861)

References
Footnotes

Bibliography

Caberini